An Iced VoVo is a wheat flour biscuit topped with 2 strips of pink fondant flanking a strip of raspberry jam and sprinkled with coconut. It is a product of the Australian-based biscuit company Arnott's (now American-owned). Previously known as Iced Vo-Vo biscuits, the brand was first registered in 1906.

On 24 November 2007, Australian Prime Minister Kevin Rudd made a light-hearted mention of Iced VoVos in his election victory speech, jokingly urging his team to have a strong cup of tea with an Iced VoVo before getting to work. This reportedly led to skyrocketing Iced VoVo sales, prompting Arnott's to send a shipping pallet of the biscuits to the Prime Minister's office in Canberra's Parliament House.

A similar product (called Mikado) has been sold in Ireland by Jacob's since 1888. It has pink marshmallow instead of pink fondant. But during the late 1980s and early 1990s there was a square shaped biscuit called Camelot.

References

External links
 1951 video of manufacture of biscuits, including Iced VoVos

Biscuit brands
Australian cuisine
Australian brands
Australian_confectionery